This is an incomplete list of fellows of the Society of Antiquaries of London. The honour, denoted by the post-nominal FSA, is awarded to members of the Society of Antiquaries of London, a learned society founded in 1707.

A–C

Silke Ackermann, elected 2005
Robert Adam (1728–1792), elected 1861
Donald Adamson (b. 1939)
R. C. Anderson (1883–1976)
Robert G. W. Anderson (b. 1944)
William Francis Ainsworth (1807–1896), elected 1853
Stewart Ainsworth (b. 1951)
John Yonge Akerman (1806–1873), elected 1834
Leslie Alcock (1925–2006)
Miranda Aldhouse-Green (b. 1947)
John Allan (1884–1955), numismatist
Bridget Allchin (1927–2017)
Bruce Allsopp (1912–2000)
Percy Willoughby Ames (1853–1919)
John Anstis, younger (1708–1754)
Ian Anstruther (1922–2007)
Francis Vyvyan Jago Arundell (1780–1846)
Thomas Ashby, FBA, FSA (1874–1931), archaeologist
Sir Leigh Ashton (1897–1983)
Sir David Attenborough (b. 1926)
Joseph Ayloffe (1708–1781).
George Paget, 7th Marquess of Anglesey (1922–2013)
Mick Aston (1946–2013)
Richard Barber (b. 1941)
Frederick Augusta Barnard (1743–1830)
Sir John Barrow (1764–1848)
Sir Wyke Bayliss (1835–1906)
Mary Beard (b. 1955)
Simon Beattie (b. 1975)
Alison Betts
Robert Bigsby (1806–1873)
Barbara Birley
William Henry Black (1808–1872)
John Thomas Blight (1835–1911)
Chiara Bonacchi
Barbara Borg (b.1960)
William Copeland Borlase (1848–1899)
Valerie Bott, elected 2020
Emrys G. Bowen (1900–1983)
Gail Boyle
Charles Angell Bradford (1864–1940)
George Weare Braikenridge (1775–1856)
John Braithwaite (1797–1870)
William Bray (1736–1832) 
David Breeze (b.1944)
Owen Salusbury Brereton (1715–1798)
Martin Bridge (b. 1957) 
John Bridges (1666–1724)
Christopher N. L. Brooke
John Charles Brooke, Somerset Herald (1748–1794)
Lyde Brown (died 1787)
Sue Brunning, Early medieval archaeologist
Richard Temple-Nugent-Brydges-Chandos-Grenville, 2nd Duke of Buckingham and Chandos (1797–1861)
John Buckler (1770–1851)
Ivor Bulmer-Thomas
Peter Burman
The Earl of Charleville (1764–1835), elected 1814.
John Caley (1760–1834)
Matthew P. Canepa (b. 1975) (art historian) 
Tobias Capwell (born ), American curator, military historian and jouster; elected 2011
George Alfred Carthew (1807–1882)
Egerton Castle (1858–1920), Victorian author, antiquarian and swordsman
Richard Chartres (b. 1947)
Bridget Cherry
Stephen Church
J. Desmond Clark (1916–2002), archaeologist, elected 1952
Kate Clark
Sir Charles Travis Clay (1885–1978),  antiquary and librarian, elected 1912
Thomas Close (1796–1881)
William Cole (1714–1782)
Bryony Coles (b. 1946)
 Dr Rob Collins (archaeologist)
John Collinson (1757–1793) 
Marion Colthorpe (d.2021), Elizabethan historian
Patrick Cormack (b. 1939)
George Richard Corner (1801–1863)
Eleri Cousins
William Cowper (1701–1767), doctor and antiquarian
Reverend J. Charles Cox (1843–1919), Author 
Thomas Gery Cullum, (1741–1831) Bath King of Arms
Barry Cunliffe (b. 1939)
James Stevens Curl (b. 1937) (architectural historian)
Cecil Curle (1901–1987), archaeologist

D–G

Ken Dark (b. 1961)
Sir Geoffrey de Bellaigue (1931–2013)
Beatrice de Cardi (1914–2016)
Guy de la Bédoyère (b. 1957)
Claudine Dauphin (b. 1950)
Brenda Dickinson
Harold Dillon, 17th Viscount Dillon (1844––1932) 
Brian Dobson (1931–2012), scholar of Hadrian's Wall
Chloë Duckworth
Sir Arthur Evans (1851–1941)
Dame Joan Evans (1893–1977) 
Sir John Evans (1823–1908) 
John Davies Evans (1925–2011)
Claire Donovan (d.2019)
Penelope Dransart
Margaret Stefana Drower (1911–2012)
Elizabeth Eames (1918–2008)
Hella Eckardt
Elisabeth Ettlinger (1915–2012)
Gail Falkingham
Richard Farmer (1735–1797)
Helen Farr
Reverend Edmund Farrer (1848–1935)
Thomas Godfrey Faussett (1829–1877)
Neil Faulkner (b. 1958)
Eric Fernie (b. 1939)
Herschell Filipowski (1816–1872)
Martin Folkes (1690–1754)
Lady Aileen Fox (1907–2005)
Sir Cyril Fox (1882–1967)
Robert Fox (b. 1938)
John Frederick France (1817–1900), Ophthalmic Surgeon, Guys Hospital
Sir Augustus Wollaston Franks (1826–1897), director of the Society 1858–1896
John Frere (1740–1807)
Charles Frost (1781?–1862)
Helen Geake (b. 1967)
Margaret Gelling (1924–2009)
Jeremy S. W.Gibson
Peter Gibson (1929–2016)
Mark Girouard (b. 1931)
Philippa Glanville (b. 1943)
John Goodall
Lindy Grant
Susan Greaney
Loyd Grossman (b. 1950)
John Mathew Gutch (1778–1861)
James Leo Forde-Johnston (1927–2001)

H–L

William Debonaire Haggard (d.1886)
Helena Hamerow
Sue Hamilton
Merlin Hanbury-Tracy, 7th Baron Sudeley (b. 1939)
Phil Harding (b. 1950)
Jessica Harrison-Hall (b.1965)
Elizabeth Hartley (b.1947)
Edwin Sidney Hartland (1848–1927)
John Harvey (1911–1997), architectural historian
Edward Hawkins (1780–1867)
Max Hebditch (b. 1937)
Wilfrid James Hemp (1882 – 14 April 1962)
Donald Henson (1956–2021)
Henry Herbert, 4th Earl of Carnarvon (1831–1890)
Georgina Herrmann (b. 1937), archaeologist
Mabel Blundell Heynemann (1866–1952), archaeologist and antiquarian
Dan Hicks (b. 1972), archaeologist
Peter Hinton, archaeologist
Neil Holbrook
John Hopkins (1918–2008), society librarian, elected 1983
R. J. Hopper (1910–1987), archaeologist
Mark Horton (b. 1956), archaeologist
William Hosking (1800–1861)
Alfred Hudd (1846–1920)
Joseph Hunter (1783–1861)
John Hurst (1927–2003), archaeologist
Alfred Hutton (1839–1910), Victorian officer, antiquarian, writer and swordsman
Edward Impey
Henry Jenner (1848–1934)
Sarah Jennings (1947–2009)
Kenneth Hamilton Jenkin (1900–1980)
Simon Swynfen Jervis (b. 1943)
Barri Jones (1936–1999)
Alison Kelly (1913–2016)
Alexander James Kent (b. 1977)
Sir Frederic G. Kenyon (1863–1952) 
Heather Knight
Kristina Krawiec
Kristian Kristiansen (born 1948), Danish prehistorian (honorary fellow)
 Peter Kurrild-Klitgaard (born 1966), Danish political scientist and armorist
Nina Frances Layard (1853–1935) Poet, prehistorian, archaeologist and antiquary, elected 3 March 1921.
Peter Le Neve (1661–1729), FRS (Norroy King of Arms) 
Carenza Lewis (b. 1964)
Jodie Lewis
David Lindsay, 27th Earl of Crawford (1871–1940)
Leonardo López Luján (born 1964), Mexican archaeologist (honorary fellow)
Lisa Lodwick (d. 2022)
John Lubbock, 1st Baron Avebury (1834–1913)
Frederick Lukis (1788–1871)
William Collings Lukis
Samuel Lysons (1763–1819)
Charles Lyttelton (1714–1768)

M–P

Jean Macdonald (1920–2021)
Sir Eric Maclagan (1879–1951)
Michael Maclagan (1914–2003) 
Sir James Mann (1897–1962) 
Owen Manning (1721–1801) 
Queen Margrethe II of Denmark (b. 1940)
Pamela Marshall
Thomas Martin (1697–1771)
Herbert Maryon, OBE, FIIC (1874–1965)
The Ven David Gwynne Meara (b. 1939)
Roger Mercer, OBE (1944–2018)
Daniel Miles (b. 1959)
Alan Millard (b. 1937)
Jeremiah Milles (1714–1784)
Philip Morant (1700–1770)
Joseph Mordaunt Crook, CBE, MA, D.Phil, FBA (b. 1937)
Edward Rowe Mores (1731–1778)
Rosalind Moss (1890–1990)
Quita Mould
Penelope Mountjoy
Geoffrey Charles Munn OBE
Oswyn Murray
J.N.L. Myres (1902–1989) 
Peter Le Neve (1661–1729)
Adam Nicolson (b. 1957)
Philip Norman (1842–1931)
Richard Ovenden (b. 1964)
Elias Owen (1833–1899)
Hugh Owen (1808–1897)
Sir Francis Palgrave K.H., F.R.S., F.S.A. (1788–1861)
Naomi Payne
Charles Reed Peers (1868–1952)
Sara Perry
Paul B. Pettitt
Stuart Piggott (1910–1996)
Giovanni Battista Piranesi (1720–1778)
Jane Portal
D'Arcy Power (1855–1941)
Francis Pryor (b. 1945)
James Pulman (1873–1859)

Q–S

Anthony Quiney (b. 1981)
Philip Rashleigh FRS MP
Benedict Read (art historian) (b. 1945)
Sir Hercules Read (1857–1929), Keeper of British and Medieval Antiquities and Ethnography at the British Museum, Secretary from 1892 and President from 1908 to 1914 and again from 1919. 
Charles Reed (1819–1881)
Mary Remnant (1935–2020) Musician, musicologist, medievalist
Colin Renfrew, Baron Renfrew of Kaimsthorn (b. 1937)
Julian C. Richards (b. 1951)
Prof. Julian D. Richards
Ian Richmond (1902–1965) 
Augustus Pitt Rivers (1827–1900)
Edward Robert Robson (1836–1917)
Charles Frederic Roberts (d. 1942)
Sir Hugh Roberts
Jane, Lady Roberts
Nicola Rogers
John Gage Rokewode, director from 1829 till 1842
Margaret Joyce Rowe
Margaret Roxan, (1924–2003)
Edward Rudge, (1792–1861) botanist and antiquary.
Edward John Rudge, M.A. (1792–1861), barrister and antiquary.
Hannah Russ
Miles Russell
John Christoper Sainty (b. 1932)
Charles Sandys (1786–1859)
Alan Saville (1946–2016), elected 1981
Edgar Ronald Seary (1908–1984)
Ruth Shaffrey
Richard 'Conversation' Sharp (1759–1835)
John Shaw (1776–1832)
John Silvester (1745–1822)
Sir John Sinclair, 1st Baronet (1754–1835)
Chris Skidmore, MP
Sir John Smith, 1st Baronet (1744–1807)
Martin Ferguson Smith (born 1940)
Spencer Gavin Smith (born 1972)
William Henry Smyth (1788–1865)
Kenneth Snowman (1919–2002)
Sir John Soane (1753–1837)
Graham Speake (b. 1929)
Albert Spencer, 7th Earl Spencer (1892–1975)
Flaxman C. J. Spurrell (1842–1915)
James Leslie Starkey (1895–1938)
David Starkey (b. 1945)
Gertrud Seidmann (1919–2013))
Thomas Stevens (1841–1920)
Philip Stell (1934–2004)
Charles Stokes (–1853)
Percy Stone (1856–1934)
William Stukeley (1687–1765)
Richard Suggett (b. ?1950)
Rachel Swallow
Brenda Swinbank (b. 1929)

T–Z

Toshiyuki Takamiya (b. 1944)
Andrew Taylor (1850–1937)
Richard Carnac Temple
James Theobald (1688–1759)
Charles Thomas (1928–2016)
Julian Thomas (b. 1959)
Roberta Tomber (1954–2022)
J. B. Trapp (1925–2005)
Walter Calverley Trevelyan (1797–1879)
Charles Truman (1949–2017)
Olga Tufnell (1905–1985)
Percival Turnbull (1953–2016)
Sarah Tyacke (born 1945), former Keeper of Public Records and Chief Executive of The National Archives
Henry Vaughan (1809–1899) 
John Venn (1834–1923), elected 1892 
Edward Vernon Utterson (c. 1776–1856)
George Vertue (1684–1756)
Randolph Vigne (1928–2016)
Caroline Vout, Reader in Classics, Cambridge University; Fellow of Christ's College, Cambridge
Susan Walker
Edith Mary Walker (1903–1970)
Lacey Wallace
Pat Wallace, former Director of the National Museum of Ireland
James Ware (ophthalmologist) (1756–1815), English eye surgeon and Fellow of Royal Society
Sir John Watney, Honorary Secretary of the City and Guilds of London Institute for the Advancement of Technical Education
Albert Way (1805–1874), 'director' 1842 till 1846
Hilary Wayment (1912–2005)
Edward Doran Webb (1864–1931)
Emma Jane Wells (b. 1986)
Leslie Peter Wenham (1911–1990), Head of history at St. Johns' College, York.
Stephen Weston (1747–1830)
Sir Mortimer Wheeler (1890–1976)
Tessa Wheeler (1893–1936)
John Whichcord Jr. (1823–1885), architect
John William Willis-Bund (1843–1928)
David Williams (1949–2017), archaeologist
Thomas Woodcock DL, Garter King of Arms
Charmian Woodfield (1929–2014), archaeologist
Peter Woodman (1943–2017), archaeologist
Michael Wood (b.1948), historian 
Albert Woods (1816–1904), Garter King of Arms
Kim Woods, art historian
Daniel Woolf (b. 1958), academic
Christopher Wright, former Head of Manuscripts at the British Library
Michael T. Wright (b. 1948)
Warwick William Wroth (1858–1911)
Ruth Young, archaeologist
George Zarnecki (1915–2008)
Andrew Ziminski, stonemason and author

References

External links
List of current Fellows, Society of Antiquaries of London

Society of Antiquaries of London
 
Society of Antiquaries of London
Fellows of the Society of Antiquaries
Society of Antiquaries of London